In the 2013–14 season, USM Alger competed in the Ligue 1 for the 36th time, as well as the Algerian Cup.  It was their 19th consecutive season in the top flight of Algerian football.

Squad list
Players and squad numbers last updated on 18 November 2016.Note: Flags indicate national team as has been defined under FIFA eligibility rules. Players may hold more than one non-FIFA nationality.

Competitions

Overview

{| class="wikitable" style="text-align: center"
|-
!rowspan=2|Competition
!colspan=8|Record
!rowspan=2|Started round
!rowspan=2|Final position / round
!rowspan=2|First match	
!rowspan=2|Last match
|-
!
!
!
!
!
!
!
!
|-
| Ligue 1

|  
| style="background:gold;"| Winners
| 24 August 2013
| 22 May 2014
|-
| Algerian Cup

| Round of 64 
| Round of 32 
| 7 December 2013
| 21 December 2013
|-
| Super Cup

| Final
| style="background:gold;"| Winners
| colspan=2| 11 January 2014
|-
! Total

Ligue 1

League table

Results by round

Matches

Algerian Cup

Algerian Super Cup

Squad information

Playing statistics

Appearances (Apps.) numbers are for appearances in competitive games only including sub appearances
Red card numbers denote:   Numbers in parentheses represent red cards overturned for wrongful dismissal.

{| class="wikitable sortable alternance"  style="font-size:80%; text-align:center; line-height:14px; width:100%;"
|-
! rowspan="2" style="width:10px;"|No.
! rowspan="2" style="width:10px;"|Nat.
! rowspan="2" scope="col" style="width:275px;"|Player
!colspan="4"|Ligue 1
!colspan="4"|Algerian Cup
!colspan="4"|Algerian Super Cup
!colspan="4"|Total
|- style="text-align:center;"
!width=40  |Apps
!width=40  |
!width=40  |
!width=40  |
!width=40  |Apps
!width=40  |
!width=40  |
!width=40  |
!width=40  |Apps
!width=40  |
!width=40  |
!width=40  |
!width=40  |Apps
!width=40  |
!width=40  |
!width=40  |
|-
|- align="center"
! colspan="19"| Goalkeepers
|- align="center"
|-
||1 |||| || 24 ||  || 3 ||  || 2 ||  || 1 ||  || 1 ||  ||  ||  || 27 ||  || 4 || 
|-
||16|||| || 5 ||  ||  ||  ||  ||  ||  ||  ||  ||  ||  ||  || 5 ||  ||  || 
|-
||29|||| || 1 ||  ||  ||  ||  ||  ||  ||  ||  ||  ||  ||  || 1 ||  ||  || 
|-
|- align="center"
! colspan="19"| Defenders
|- align="center"
|-
||4 |||| || 8+3 ||  || 2 ||  ||  ||  ||  ||  ||  ||  ||  ||  || 8+3 ||  || 2 || 
|-
||6 |||| || 25 || 5 || 3 ||  || 2 ||  ||  ||  || 1 ||  ||  ||  || 28 || 5 || 3 || 
|-
||20 |||| || 26 || 2 || 4 ||  || 2 ||  ||  ||  || 1 ||  ||  ||  || 29 || 2 || 4 || 
|-
||24 |||| || 3+2 ||  || 1 ||  ||  ||  ||  ||  ||  ||  ||  ||  || 3+2 ||  || 1 || 
|-
||26 |||| || 11+7 || 1 || 5 || 1 || 2 ||  ||  ||  ||  ||  ||  ||  || 13+7 || 1 || 5 || 1
|-
||19 |||| || 1 ||  ||  ||  ||  ||  ||  ||  ||  ||  ||  ||  || 1 ||  ||  || 
|-
|| |||| || 0+1 ||  ||  ||  ||  ||  ||  ||  ||  ||  ||  ||  || 0+1 ||  ||  || 
|-
||25|||| || 21+3 ||  ||  ||  || 2 ||  || 1 ||  || 1 ||  ||  ||  || 24+3 ||  || 1 || 
|-
||30 |||| || 23+2 || 4 || 4 || 1 || 2 ||  || 1 ||  || 1 ||  ||  ||  || 26+2 || 4 || 5 || 1
|-
|- align="center"
! colspan="19"| Midfielders
|- align="center"
|-
||21|||| || 2+1 ||  ||  ||  ||  ||  ||  ||  ||  ||  ||  ||  || 2+1 ||  ||  || 
|-
||28|||| || 8+7 || 1 || 2 ||  || 1 ||  ||  ||  || 0+1 ||  ||  ||  || 9+8 || 1 || 2 || 
|-
||11|||| || 15+4 ||  || 3 || 2 || 1+1 ||  || 1 ||  || 1 ||  ||  ||  || 17+5 ||  || 4 || 2
|-
||13|||| || 21 ||  || 5 ||  || 2 ||  ||  ||  || 1 ||  ||  ||  || 24 ||  || 5 || 
|-
||14|||| || 12+6 || 2 ||  ||  || 2 ||  || 1 ||  ||  ||  ||  ||  || 14+6 || 2 || 1 || 
|-
||15|||| || 20+5 || 4 || 4 ||  || 0+1 ||  ||  ||  || 1 ||  ||  ||  || 21+6 || 4 || 4 || 
|-
||23|||| || 21+2 ||  || 3 ||  || 1 ||  ||  ||  ||  ||  ||  ||  || 22+2 ||  || 3 || 
|-
||47|||| || 29 || 5 || 3 || 1 || 1 ||  ||  ||  || 1 ||  ||  ||  || 31 || 5 || 3 || 1
|-
|- align="center"
! colspan="19"| Forwards
|- align="center"
|-
||7 |||| || 5+1 || 2 ||  ||  ||  ||  ||  ||  ||  ||  ||  ||  || 5+1 || 2 ||  || 
|-
||17|||| || 1+8 || 1 || 1 ||  ||  ||  ||  ||  ||  ||  ||  ||  || 1+8 || 1 || 1 || 
|-
||31|||| || 3+3 || 1 || 2 ||  || 0+1 ||  ||  ||  ||  ||  ||  ||  || 3+4 || 1 || 2 || 
|-
||8 |||| || 8+8 || 6 || 2 || 1 || 1 ||  ||  ||  || 0+1 ||  ||  ||  || 9+9 || 6 || 2 || 1
|-
||2 |||| || 11+10 || 5 || 3 || 1 || 0+2 ||  ||  ||  || 1 || 1 ||  ||  || 12+12 || 6 || 3 || 1
|-
||18|||| || 13+3 || 3 || 1 ||  || 0+1 ||  ||  ||  ||  ||  ||  ||  || 13+4 || 3 || 1 || 
|-
||9 |||| || 13+3 || 5 || 5 ||  || 1 ||  || 1 ||  || 1 || 1 ||  ||  || 15+3 || 6 || 6 || 
|-
|| |||| || 0+1 ||  ||  ||  ||  ||  ||  ||  ||  ||  ||  ||  || 0+1 ||  ||  ||  
|-
||7 |||| || 0+4 ||  ||  ||  ||  ||  ||  ||  ||  ||  ||  ||  || 0+4 ||  ||  ||  
|-

|- class="sortbottom"
|colspan="3" |Own goals
|! style="background:white; text-align: center;" |
| 0
|! colspan="3" style="background:white; text-align: center;" |
| 0
|! colspan="3" style="background:white; text-align: center;" |
| 0
|! colspan="3" style="background:white; text-align: center;" |
| 0
|! colspan="2" style="background:white; text-align: center;" |
|- class="sortbottom"
|colspan="4"  style="background:white; text-align: center;" |Totals
|49 ||53 ||7
|! rowspan="2" style="background:white; text-align: center;" |
|0 ||7 ||0
|! rowspan="2" style="background:white; text-align: center;" |
|2 ||0 ||0
|! rowspan="2" style="background:white; text-align: center;" |
|51 ||60 ||7

Goalscorers
Includes all competitive matches. The list is sorted alphabetically by surname when total goals are equal.

Clean sheets 
Includes all competitive matches.

Transfers

In

Out

References

External links
 2013–14 USM Alger season at dzfoot.com 

USM Alger seasons
Algerian football clubs 2013–14 season